Emociones is a 1996 album by American vocalist Vikki Carr. It was nominated for a Grammy Award for Best Latin Pop Performance. The album, which was released on the Rodven Records/PolyGram labels, is a tribute to songwriters Manuel Alejandro and Roberto Carlos.

Track listing
Propuesta
Que Tal Te Va Sin Mi
Los Amantes
Emociones
La Distancia
Digan Lo Que Digan
Concavo y Convexo
Que No Se Rompa la Noche
En Carne Viva
A La Antigua
Para Volver a Volver
Detalles

References

External links
Vikki Carr

1996 albums
Vikki Carr albums